Reepicheep the Mouse is a fictional character in the children's fantasy series The Chronicles of Narnia by C. S. Lewis. He appears as a minor character in Prince Caspian and as a major character in The Voyage of the Dawn Treader, and also briefly at the end of The Last Battle. Reepicheep is a Talking Mouse, the leader of the Talking Mice of Narnia; he is irascible yet imperturbably courteous, utterly without fear, and motivated by a deep concern for honour.

Description
Reepicheep is a "gay and martial mouse", about two feet high when standing on his hind legs, with ears "nearly as long as (though broader than) a rabbit's"; small Talking Beasts in Narnia are very much larger than their "dumb" counterparts. He speaks with a shrill, piping voice. His fur is very dark, almost black. He wears a thin circlet of gold on his head, with a crimson feather. His weapon is a rapier.

Appearances

In Prince Caspian
Reepicheep leads the Talking Mice in battle against the Telmarines under Caspian's command. He is badly wounded, losing his tail, in the climactic conflict. Lucy heals his wounds with her magic cordial, but he finds when he rises to address Aslan that his tail has not regrown, and he apologizes for appearing in such a dishonourable state. Aslan counters that he is perhaps too concerned about his honour. Reepicheep, in a key speech, replies to the effect that Talking Mice, being very small, would be at a constant disadvantage if they did not zealously guard their honour. The other Talking Mice prepare to cut their own tails off if their Chief is not allowed to retain his, at which Aslan relents and miraculously restores Reepicheep's tail.

In The Voyage of the Dawn Treader
The only Talking Beast amongst the titular ship's crew, Reepicheep reveals that he has been driven since infancy by a vision of finding Aslan's Country across the sea in the far east of the Narnian world. His aspirations and code of honour bring him into conflict early with the egregious Eustace, but when the latter is turned into a dragon by a curse, Reepicheep becomes his chief friend and comforter. It is Reepicheep who urges the Dawn Treader to sail into the mysterious Island of Darkness, thus facilitating the rescue of Lord Rhoop, the fourth of the Seven Lords of Narnia whom it is their mission to find. The final three are found in a cursed sleep on Ramandu's Island, which can only be broken, the party are told, if they sail to the End of the World and there leave at least one of their number never to return; Reepicheep volunteers for this role and, at the end of the book, carries through with it, thereby both breaking the curse and fulfilling his vision.

In The Last Battle
When the main characters reach the gates of the Garden in Aslan's Country at the end of The Last Battle, it is Reepicheep who greets them.

Thematic significance

Christian elements
While The Chronicles of Narnia are often described as an allegory for Christianity, Lewis (himself an expert on allegory in literature) disputed this description on technical grounds, since most of the characters and plot elements do not "stand for" figures or events in Christian doctrine in any simple way. When a class of American fifth-graders wrote asking what the characters in Prince Caspian represented, Lewis replied

In a letter to one reader, Lewis laid out the plan of the Narnia series: "The whole Narnian story is about Christ." Each book, he said, was intended to showcase a different aspect of Christianity, and for The Voyage of the Dawn Treader it was "the spiritual life (specially in Reepicheep)".

Chivalry
As a model both of ferocity on the battlefield and of courtesy in polite society, Reepicheep embodies the knightly ideal Lewis prescribes for manhood in his 1940 essay The Necessity of Chivalry.

Portrayals
In the 1989 television serial produced by the BBC, Prince Caspian and the Voyage of the Dawn Treader, Reepicheep was portrayed by Warwick Davis.
For the BBC Radio 4 adaptation (1995−1997), Reepicheep was voiced by Sylvester McCoy.
For the Focus on the Family Radio Theatre adaptation (1999−2002), Reepicheep was voiced by Robert Benfield.
In the Walden Media Narnia films, Reepicheep was voiced by Eddie Izzard in Prince Caspian and by Simon Pegg in The Voyage of the Dawn Treader.

References

 Lewis, C.S. (1951), Prince Caspian, Macmillan, New York
 Lewis, C.S. (1952), The Voyage of the Dawn Treader, Macmillan, New York
 Lewis, C.S. (1956), The Last Battle, Macmillan, New York

Mice and rats in literature
Anthropomorphic mice and rats
Fictional swordfighters
Fictional tribal chiefs
Talking animals in fiction
The Chronicles of Narnia characters
Literary characters introduced in 1951